Gareth Gwilym Sims (born 20 July 1983) is a former Zimbabwean cricketer. Born in Harare, he played one first-class match for Manicaland during the 2001–02 Logan Cup.

References

External links
 
 

1983 births
Living people
Cricketers from Harare
Manicaland cricketers
Zimbabwean cricketers